Anamaria Nesteriuc (born 29 November 1993) is a Romanian athlete specialising in the sprint hurdles. She represented her country at the 2018 World Indoor Championships without reaching the semifinals.

Her personal bests are 13.19 seconds in the 100 metres hurdles (+1.5 m/s, Novi Pazar 2017) and 8.17 seconds in the 60 metres hurdles (Istanbul 2018).

International competitions

References

1993 births
Living people
Romanian female hurdlers
Universiade medalists in athletics (track and field)
Universiade bronze medalists for Romania
Medalists at the 2017 Summer Universiade
Iuliu Hațieganu University of Medicine and Pharmacy alumni
European Games competitors for Romania
Athletes (track and field) at the 2019 European Games
20th-century Romanian women
21st-century Romanian women